Aberdeen Maritime Museum is a maritime museum in Aberdeen, Scotland.

The museum is situated on the historic Shiprow in the heart of the city, near the harbour. It makes use of a range of buildings including the former Trinity Congregational Church, which was converted to be used as an extension of the museum, and Provost Ross' House, one of the oldest domestic buildings in the city.

The museum tells the story of the city's long relationship with the North Sea. Its collections cover shipbuilding, fast sailing ships, fishing and port history, and displays on the North Sea oil industry.

History 
The Aberdeen Maritime Museum was built in 1593 by master-mason Andrew Jamieson, and was extended to the south in 1710. In 1702 Provost John Ross of Arnage, who was a ship owner, took it as his residence. In the 19th century, the building became a set of tenements and became derelict by 1950. In 1984, the building was bought by the National Trust for Scotland who leased it to Aberdeen City Council. The building subsequently became the Aberdeen Maritime Museum.

A few years after buying the building, the council bought the Trinity Congregational Church, aiming to convert it into an extension for the museum. It opened in 1997.

See also 

 List of museums in Scotland

External links  
 Aberdeen City Council Museum homepage
 Aberdeen Built Ships Project website 
 Aberdeen Quest website
 Travel-Island.com Photo Gallery Museum Maritime Aberdeen

References

Maritime Museum
Maritime museums in Scotland